Pinger is a texting and VoIP app developing company.

Pinger may also refer to:
 Ping'er, fictional character in Dream of the Red Chamber
 PingER Project, an internet performance reporting tool
 Textfree (formerly called Pinger), a phone and texting app
 Underwater locator beacon

See also
 Binger (surname) 
 Dinger (disambiguation)
 Ping (disambiguation)
 Pinge (surname) pronounced as "Pinger"